Madeleine Leroy (1685–1749), was a French industrialist.  After the death of her husband in 1706, she managed one of the biggest faience-factories in France in Marseilles, with export internationally to both the Middle East and America. She was the daughter of Anne Heraud (d. 1710), who was one of the pioneers of the faience manufacture in France, and took over her business as well.

References

1749 deaths
18th-century French businesswomen
18th-century French businesspeople
1685 births
Businesspeople from Marseille